Fouquières-lès-Lens (literally Fouquières near Lens) is a commune in the Pas-de-Calais department in the Hauts-de-France region of France.

Geography

Population

Places of interest
 The church of St.Vaast, rebuilt, as was most of the village, after the First World War.
 The war memorial.

See also
Communes of the Pas-de-Calais department

References

External links

 Website of the Communaupole de Lens-Liévin 
 Website of Fouquières-lez-Lens 

Fouquieresleslens
Artois